Maids of honour tart (also known as maids of honour cake and Richmond maids of honour) is a traditional English baked tart consisting of a puff pastry shell filled with cheese curds.  A variation is to add jam or almonds and nutmeg.   Traditionally the tart was a puff pastry filled with sweetened milk curds.

The tart is said to date back to King Henry VIII when he witnessed some of the Queen's Maids of honour eating some cakes and demanded to taste one.  He found them delicious and named them after the maids.  Some even claim that the maid who made the tarts was imprisoned and had to produce them solely for the King. However, there is another theory that they were named after Anne Boleyn, a maid of honour at the time, who made the cakes for Henry VIII.

A tea room in Kew, south-west London, "The Original Maids of Honour", dates back to the 18th century and was set up specifically to sell these tarts.

See also
 Custard tart
 List of pies, tarts and flans

References

External links
The Original Maids of Honour website with additional information

British pies
British desserts
English cuisine
Sweet pies
Tarts
Puff pastry
Stuffed desserts
Cheese desserts